The Golden Era Committee was one of three 16-member committees appointed by the board of directors of the National Baseball Hall of Fame and Museum ("the Hall of Fame") in 2010 to replace the National Baseball Hall of Fame Committee on Baseball Veterans (best known as the Veterans Committee), which had been formed in 1953. All of these committees were established to consider and elect eligible candidates to the Hall of Fame who were not elected via the Baseball Writers' Association of America (BBWAA) ballot.

The Golden Era Committee considered players no longer eligible for election via BBWAA balloting—along with managers, umpires, and executives—from the 1947 to 1972 era. Half of the committee's 16 members were Hall of Fame inductees, and the balance were baseball executives and media members. A BBWAA-appointed Historical Overview Committee would identify ten candidates for consideration by the Golden Era Committee every three years.

The Golden Era Committee considered nominees in 2011 (selecting Ron Santo) and in 2014 (making no selections). In July 2016, the Hall of Fame announced a restructuring of committees; the Golden Era Committee was superseded by the Golden Days Committee, to consider candidates from 1950 to 1969, beginning in 2021 for induction in 2022.

Golden Era Ballot candidates

Eligibility requirements
 Players: Having played in at least 10 major league seasons, not being on Major League Baseball's ineligibility list, and having been retired for 21 or more seasons.
 Managers and umpires: Having served for at least 10 seasons, not being on Major League Baseball's ineligibility list, and having either been retired for at least five years or both attained 65 years of age and been retired for at least six months.
 Executives: Having either been retired for at least five years or attained 65 years of age.

All candidates receiving votes on at least 75% of ballots cast will earn election.

2011 Election (for Hall of Fame class of 2012)
(Major League Baseball Winter Meeting, December 5, 2011)

Golden Era Committee members 

The Baseball Hall of Fame officially named this group the "Golden Era Committee", which voted for the first time on December 5, 2011. The Hall of Fame members on the committee were inducted as players except for executive Pat Gillick and Tommy Lasorda who was inducted as a manager.
 Committee chairman and secretary (non-voting) (chairman of the board of directors of the Hall of Fame): Jane Forbes Clark
 Hall of Famers (8): Hank Aaron, Pat Gillick, Al Kaline, Ralph Kiner, Tommy Lasorda, Juan Marichal, Brooks Robinson, Billy Williams
 Executives (5): Paul Beeston (Toronto Blue Jays), Bill Dewitt (St. Louis Cardinals), Ronald Hemond (Arizona Diamondbacks), Gene Michael (New York Yankees, and Al Rosen (retired)
 Media members (3): Dick Kaegel (The Kansas City Star), Jack O'Connell (New York Daily News, Hartford Courant), and Dave Van Dyck ( Chicago Tribune)

Golden Era ballot and vote totals

The Golden Era Committee elected Ron Santo to the National Baseball Hall of Fame with 15 out of 16 of their votes. With a 75 percent vote needed for election, Santo was the first and only Golden Era Ballot candidate elected to the Hall of Fame Class of 2012. The Hall of Fame induction ceremony was held on Sunday, July 22, 2012, in Cooperstown, New York.

 denotes inducted to the Hall of Fame

2014 Election (for Hall of Fame class of 2015)
(Major League Baseball Winter Meeting, December 8, 2014)

Golden Era Committee members

The Golden Era Committee's 16-member voting electorate, appointed by the Hall of Fame's board of directors, was announced at the same time as the ballot of 10 candidates. All of the Hall of Fame members on this committee were inducted as players, except for executive Pat Gillick.
 Committee chairman and secretary (non-voting) (chairman of the board of directors of the Hall of Fame): Jane Forbes Clark
 Hall of Famers (8): Jim Bunning, Rod Carew, Pat Gillick, Ferguson Jenkins, Al Kaline, Joe Morgan, Ozzie Smith, Don Sutton
 Executives (4): Jim Frey (retired from Chicago Cubs), David Glass (Kansas City Royals), Roland Hemond (Arizona Diamondbacks), Bob Watson (retired from MLB front office)
 Media (4): Steve Hirdt (Elias Sports Bureau), Dick Kaegel (The Kansas City Star), Phil Pepe (New York Daily News), Tracy Ringolsby (various outlets including the Rocky Mountain News)

Golden Era ballot and vote totals
The ballot for election by the Golden Era Committee was released on October 30, 2014; the committee voted at the MLB winter meetings in San Diego on December 8, 2014, with the results announced by MLB immediately thereafter. Election criteria remained the standard 75%, or 12 of 16 votes. None of the candidates received enough votes, continuing a long period of difficulty in electing players eligible under the Hall's special committees; the last living player elected to the Hall after the expiration of their BBWAA eligibility was Bill Mazeroski in 2001.

See also
 List of members of the Baseball Hall of Fame

References

External links

 Official website of the National Baseball Hall of Fame and Museum

Baseball organizations
Awards juries and committees